Varėna (Oran) is a city in Dzūkija, Lithuania.

History
At that time it was a small settlement, but following steady development it eventually became the center of the district. In the interbellum period, following World War I, the town was annexed by Poland, and renamed Orany. It was located near the then Polish-Lithuanian border, in the Wilno-Troki County (Powiat wileńsko-trocki) of the Wilno Voivodeship. In 1939, following the German-Soviet Invasion of Poland, Varėna was returned to Lithuania.

On September 9, 1942, all the Jews of the town of Varėna were collected in the local synagogue. On that day, even though the Germans had tried to prevent him from doing so, the priest Jonas Gylys entered the synagogue and encouraged the Jews to be brave in their last hours rather than convert to Christianity.

On the following day (or, according to another source, on the 9th itself) all of the Jews were taken from the synagogue to Eserekiai - a grove of trees near the village of Druckūnai,  from the town, on the side of the road leading to the village. Germans forced the victims in groups toward the pits and shot them there.

According to the report of Karl Jaeger, commander of Einsatzkommando 3A, 831 Jews from Varėna (and the surrounding areas) – 541 men, 149 women, and 141 children – were killed on that day.

In 1946 around 2000 Poles were repatriated to Poland.

Following industrialization in the 1970s, the town grew rapidly. Currently there are 9,240 residents in Varėna. The Varėna district is the largest and most forested region in Lithuania.

People
 Lithuanian painter and composer Mikalojus Konstantinas Čiurlionis was born in Sena Varėna in 1875.

Twin towns — Sister cities

Varėna is twinned with:
  Mikołajki, Poland

References

External links

 The murder of the Jews of Varėna during World War II, at Yad Vashem website.

 
Cities in Alytus County
Cities in Lithuania
Municipalities administrative centres of Lithuania
Trakai Voivodeship
Troksky Uyezd
Wilno Voivodeship (1926–1939)
Holocaust locations in Lithuania